The Mechanical Monsters (1941) is the second of seventeen animated Technicolor short films based upon the DC Comics character Superman. Produced by Fleischer Studios, the story features Superman battling a mad scientist and his army of robots. It was originally released by Paramount Pictures on November 28, 1941.

Plot
A robot flies into a scientist's secret lair and unloads a pile of cash into a vault. The robot is controlled completely from the scientist's command center, and many robots similar to it are lined up along the walls of the lair. The front page of the Daily Planet reports the robot's robbery right alongside an announcement for the display of 50 million dollars of the world's rarest gems at the local museum.

Later, as Lois Lane and Clark Kent are covering the museum's exhibit for the Planet, a robot lands in the street outside. The police pelt it with machine gun fire as it marches towards the museum, but the bullets bounce harmlessly off. Museum visitors, including Clark and Lois, flee as the robot marches towards the jewels and begins loading them into an opening in its back. 
 While Clark phones the Planet from the nearest phone booth, Lois climbs into the robot's back, just as it leaves the museum and takes off into the sky. Clark emerges from the booth, notices Lois gone, and says, "This is a job for Superman!" He goes back into the phone booth and changes his clothes, emerging in his classic red-and-blue costume.

Flying high above the city, Superman spots the robot and uses his X-ray vision to see Lois inside with the jewels. He lands on it and struggles to open the door in its back, only to have the scientist maneuver the robot upside down and throw him off into a power line, tangling him in the wires. As the robot is upside down, the door flies open and all the jewels fall out in the process, with Lois surviving only by hanging for dear life until the robot flips back over.

As Superman struggles to free himself from the wires, the robot arrives at the lair, but instead of jewels, the scientist finds Lois in its payload. Infuriated, he asks her what she did with the jewels, but she suggests that he "read about it in tomorrow's papers". The next time we see her, she is bound and gagged on a platform held over a pot of boiling metal in part of what appears to be an industrial foundry. The scientist pulls a lever which starts some machinery gradually lowering her closer and closer to the liquid.

Meanwhile, Superman frees himself from the power lines and knocks down the door to the scientist's lair, only to meet the army of robots (numbers 1-9, 11, 13-17, 19-23, 25, and 27 are seen). Under the scientist's control, the robots emit fire from nozzles positioned on the lower part of their heads, encircle Superman, and pound him with their fists. Initially, the robots seem to have the upper hand, beating Superman to the ground, but Superman defeats them, sending the scientist running. When Superman catches up with him, he is holding a knife to the rope holding Lois's platform above the molten metal, and threatens to cut it if he takes another step. Superman makes a move, the rope is cut, and Superman speeds across the room to catch Lois just in time, landing on a ledge below the pot of molten metal and the scientist. The scientist then pulls a lever to dump the hot liquid on them, but Superman shields Lois with his cape, then grabs the scientist and flies from the lair to take him and Lois back to the city. The next issue of the Planet details that the robots are destroyed, the jewels are recovered, and the scientist is incarcerated for the thefts. In the office, Clark says "That's a wonderful story, Lois". She replies, "Thanks Clark, but I owe it all to Superman". Clark smiles.

Cast
 Bud Collyer as Clark Kent / Superman, Police Officer, Inventor
 Joan Alexander as Lois Lane
 Jackson Beck as the Narrator

Production notes
This film marks the only instance in which Superman is depicted using x-ray vision in a Fleischer short.

The robot that enters the museum, steals the jewels, and flies back to the villain's lair, is identified with the number 13 on both its chest and back in all of its scenes except for two when it enters the museum. In those, the number on its back is 5 (even though the number on its chest is 13).

References in later works
The Mechanical Monsters is the first story (from any medium) that features Clark Kent using a telephone booth to discard his street clothes and change into Superman. This plot device would thereafter become commonly associated with the character.

The Mechanical Monsters is referenced in Hayao Miyazaki's animated film Castle in the Sky.

In the short World of Tomorrow (2003) by director Kerry Conran, and his 2004 feature film Sky Captain and the World of Tomorrow (also released by Paramount), based on the short, in both cases, in which an army of robots attack New York City.

The film was parodied in the 1995 Toon Disney series The Shnookums and Meat Funny Cartoon Show in the short "Darkness on the Edge of Black".

Historians also point out the similarity between the robot in episode 155 of the television series Lupin the Third Part II, "Farewell My Beloved Lupin" (also written and directed by Hayao Miyazaki), and the ones in The Mechanical Monsters.

A mechanical monster is seen on display in Superman's Fortress of Solitude in the 2007 animated film Superman: Doomsday.

During a second season episode of the HBO drama television series The Wire, a character can be seen watching The Mechanical Monsters on TV, paralleling a robbery that is about to occur.

In 2011, animator Robb Pratt posted on his YouTube channel, the short Superman Classic, where the hero confronts giant robots, most of which are seen flying in the same manner as the Mechanical Monsters. At one point he picks up a toy robot that also somewhat resembles one of the Mechanical Monsters.

In 2013, Sean "Smeghead" Moore, creator of the web series Cinematic Excrement, created a humorous commentary track for the short.

Between 2013 and 2015, comic book creator Brian Fies released a webcomic entitled The Last Mechanical Monster, which acts as a sequel to The Mechanical Monsters.

In the 84th episode of Batman: The Animated Series, "Deep Freeze", Mr. Freeze is kidnapped by a robot resembling the Mechanical Monster robots and is hidden inside the robot's chest cavity, like Lois Lane does in the original short. The robot is also impervious to machine-gun fire, like in the original short.

In the 84th episode of Young Justice, "Og Htrof Dna Reuqnoc!", the second news report about Superman is shown to have been broadcast on November 28 at 19:41 and accounts his battle with "mechanical monsters".

References

External links
  
 
 The Mechanical Monsters at the Internet Archive
 The Mechanical Monsters at the Internet Movie Database

1941 short films
1941 animated films
1940s American animated films
1940s animated short films
1940s animated superhero films
Superman animated shorts
Fleischer Studios short films
Short films directed by Dave Fleischer
American robot films
Animated films about robots
Articles containing video clips
Paramount Pictures short films
Rotoscoped films
Mad scientist films
1940s English-language films
American animated short films